In Greek mythology, Teleon (Ancient Greek: Τελέων, gen. Τελέοντος) may refer to the following two distinct characters:

 Teleon, the Attican father of Butes, one of the Argonauts. His wife was called Zeuxippe, daughter of the river god Eridanos. 
 Teleon, the Locrian father of Eribotes, another Argonaut. Hyginus names Apollonius describes Teleon as "virtuous", but beyond that, no information on this figure is available.

Notes

References 

 Apollonius Rhodius, Argonautica translated by Robert Cooper Seaton (1853-1915), R. C. Loeb Classical Library Volume 001. London, William Heinemann Ltd, 1912. Online version at the Topos Text Project.
 Apollonius Rhodius, Argonautica. George W. Mooney. London. Longmans, Green. 1912. Greek text available at the Perseus Digital Library.
 Gaius Julius Hyginus, Fabulae from The Myths of Hyginus translated and edited by Mary Grant. University of Kansas Publications in Humanistic Studies. Online version at the Topos Text Project.

Attican characters in Greek mythology
Locrian characters in Greek mythology
Attic mythology
Locrian mythology